Ndèye Ndiaye (born 2 May 1979 in Dakar) is a Senegalese professional women's basketball player with Tarbes GB of the Ligue Féminine de Basketball. Ndiaye is an alumnus of Southern Nazarene University in Oklahoma, USA.

She is a regular on the Senegal women's national basketball team.

External links
 Short biography at freeplayers.com

1979 births
Living people
Basketball players from Dakar
Senegalese women's basketball players
Senegalese expatriate basketball people in the United States
Southern Nazarene University alumni
African Games gold medalists for Senegal
African Games medalists in basketball
Southern Nazarene Crimson Storm women's basketball players
Senegalese expatriate basketball people in France
Competitors at the 2011 All-Africa Games